Henry Addison (1821–1887) was an English soldier.

Henry Addison may also refer to:

Henry Addison (mayor) (1798–1870), American politician and merchant
Henry Robert Addison (1805–1876), English writer